New Zealand Knights Football Club (formed from the Football Kingz Football Club in 2004) were the only professional association football club in New Zealand before they became defunct. Based in Auckland, New Zealand, they played in the A-League, Australia's premier football competition and have since been replaced by the Wellington Phoenix.

History

Kingz and the NSL 1999–2004

Football Kingz FC (promoted as "Auckland Kingz" within Australia) joined the Australian National Soccer League in 1999 and proceeded to play in the last five seasons of the NSL, failing to qualify for the playoffs in every season. The club was originally to use the spelling of "Kings", however this was changed to the Kingz after receiving legal threats from the Sydney Kings basketball franchise.

Restructuring Football Kingz into New Zealand Knights
The Football Kingz brand was disestablished in 2004 and was restructured into the New Zealand Knights as a new franchise for Australia's new national football competition called the A-League. Market research carried out by the club, to determine the viability of a new identity for the team, indicated that 76% of respondents were in favour of a name change. When that research was focused on those aged 35 and under, the percentage in favour of a change rose to 90%. Further to that, the name of "Knights" were polled best of all names suggested in the survey, a clear 30% higher than any other option.

The former Football Kingz FC General manager Guy Hedderwick was promoted to the role of New Zealand Knights chief executive officer. Alongside him Football Kingz and Waitakere City Chairman, Anthony Lee, became the New Zealand Knights Chairman in the restructuring.

Initially Anthony Lee had invested into the New Zealand Knights, with his company's (Total Football Ltd) 20% shareholding second only to majority owner Brian Katzen's Octagon Sport (later included Maurice Cox as partner) with 60%. The other shareholders were Sky Television (5%), Chris Turner (10%), and New Zealand Soccer (non-cash 5%).

The only major sponsor the club had was retailer Zero's New Zealand (Sub Sandwiches). They agreed to a deal with the Knights over the first three seasons in a six figure deal as a sleeve sponsor.

New Zealand Knights was confirmed as one of the eight founding teams in the A-League.John Adshead, who took the New Zealand national side, the All Whites to their first ever World Cup finals appearance in 1982 was named their inaugural manager/coach. former New Zealand international, Danny Hay, who previously played in the English Premiership with Leeds United was named the inaugural captain of the team.

New Zealand Knights A-League seasons 2005–2007
Despite having a squad boasting several players with extensive experience in English football, many pundits did not rate the Knights as serious contenders for the A-League title, and they were considered favourites for the wooden spoon. These predictions turned out to be true, with New Zealand Knights proving to be well out of their depth in their debut A-League season.

In April 2006, after the poor season, manager John Adshead resigned from the club. Paul Nevin was confirmed as manager a month later, having worked as caretaker manager since the position was vacated by Adshead.

In late October 2006, as a result of low crowd attendance at North Harbour Stadium in Auckland and continual poor on-field performances, rumours began to circulate that Football Federation Australia (FFA) was considering the possibility of revoking the Knights' A-League licence and granting it to a new team that would be set to enter the competition in the 2007–08 season.

On 15 November and nearing the end of the November transfer window New Zealand Knights board and management decided to relieve Paul Nevin of his coaching duties due to a string of poor performances.

On 13 December 2006, strong rumours resurfaced that the FFA was considering the revocation of the Knights' licence to compete in the A-League. It quickly became clear that, with five weeks remaining in the current season, the FFA fully intended to reclaim the licence from the Knights. The FFA had continued to express angst at low attendance numbers, poor on-field performance and the lack of domestically developed players.

Late on 14 December, the FFA announced that it had revoked the competition licence held by the Knights' owners. An arrangement with NZ Soccer would see the national body step in to manage the club for the remaining five weeks of the regular season, with former All Whites player Ricki Herbert to fill the role of head coach.

Effectively, the Knights dissolved on 21 January, when the final match of the season was played against Perth Glory FC.

On 19 March 2007 after several delays, Wellington Phoenix was selected as the successor to the New Zealand Knights.

A-League Seasonal Results

Future
There has been recent speculation  on a possible return for the New Zealand Knights, or another Auckland-based team, to re-join the A-League. Encouraging crowds of 20,078 in November 2011 when Wellington Phoenix played Adelaide United and 11,566 in January 2013 when Wellington Phoenix played Perth Glory, both held at Eden Park, have added to the push for the addition of a second New Zealand team in the A-League .

Stadium

North Harbour Stadium is a rectangular stadium situated in Albany on Auckland's North Shore in New Zealand. It was opened in 1997 after nearly a decade of discussion, planning and construction.

North Harbour Stadium has four main seating areas with an official capacity of 25,000. 19,000 (76%) of this capacity is seated, and the other 6,000 are on grass embankments.

Main Grandstand — A futuristic looking structure with a distinctive arched roof. It has three main tiers of seating, as well as a row of corporate boxes and several corporate lounges. A total of 12,000 can be seated, mostly under the roof. This is on the southern side of the ground.
Open Stand — A single uncovered tier opposite the Main Grandstand that can seat 7,000.
Embankments — At either end (East/West) of the ground, there is a single-tier grass embankment with a capacity of 3,000 people. The scoreboard is at the Western End, while the replay screen is directly opposite.

The stadium is lit with four 45 m tall light towers.

Colours and badge
The Knights played in all-black strips, with a silver left sleeve. The change strip was white, with black shorts and white socks.

The badge was designed for the inaugural 2005–06 season and launched at the January 2005 press conference which highlighted the club name change.

Supporters
The New Zealand Knights supporter base was known as Bloc 5.

Players

Former players
see List of New Zealand Knights FC players

Club Captains
 2005  Danny Hay
 2006  Darren Bazeley

Manager history

All Time League records
Record Victory: 3–1 vs Queensland Roar (H), 29 December 2006
Record Defeat: 0–5 vs Queensland Roar (A), 15 September 2006
Highest League Crowd: 9,827 vs Sydney FC, 2 September 2005
Lowest League Crowd: 1,632 vs Central Coast Mariners, 28 September 2006
Winning Streak: 2 games (29 December 2006 – 7 January 2007)
Undefeated Streak: 4 games (29 December 2006 – 21 January 2007)
Losing Streak: 11 games (18 September 2005 – 1 December 2005)
Winless Streak: 18 games (18 September 2005 – 2 September 2006)
Goals in a game: 2 – Jeremy Brockie vs Newcastle Jets (H), 4 November 2005
Goals in a season: 4 – Jeremy Brockie, Simon Yeo, 2005/06
Most Assists in a season: 3 – Sean Devine, 2005/06
All-time most Appearances: 41 – Darren Bazeley
All-time Top Scorer: 4 – Jeremy Brockie and Simon Yeo

See also

Football Kingz FC
Wellington Phoenix FC
New Zealand Football
Football Federation Australia
A-League

Notes

d Caretaker manager after Paul Nevin was removed of coaching duties.
e Caretaker manager for the remainder of the season before the club was to be defunct.

References

External links

 
Former A-League Men teams
Knights
Association football clubs established in 2004
Association football clubs disestablished in 2007
Association football clubs in Auckland
2004 establishments in New Zealand
2007 disestablishments in New Zealand
Expatriated football clubs